Hornsey College of Art (a.k.a. Hornsey School of Art) was a college in Crouch End in the London Borough of Haringey, England. The HCA was "an iconic British art institution, renowned for its experimental and progressive approach to art and design education".

Background
The college was founded in 1880 as the Hornsey School of Arts by Charles Swinstead, an artist and teacher who lived at Crouch End, Hornsey. The college passed to his son, Frank Swinstead, following his death in 1890. During the inter-war years the schools curriculum was composed of Fine Art, Advertising Design and Industrial Applied Art. It continued its day-time classes during World War II and was one of only two London art schools that did not vacate the capital during the blitz.

It became Hornsey College of Arts and Crafts in 1955. It survived until 1973 as a named entity, when it joined Enfield Technical College and Hendon Technical College to become Middlesex Polytechnic.  The Polytechnic later became Middlesex University.

The 1968 sit-in
During 1968, the college was the scene of protests when students occupied the Crouch End Hill site. Students attending the multi-site college convened to discuss the withdrawal of Student Union funds and resolved to sit-in. During this period they effected a temporary administration of the college, and called for major and consultative review of the art curriculum, supported by sympathetic academic staff and visiting artists. They offered a major critique of the education system at the time. Some of these documents were presented as part of a project called The Hornsey Project. The college was repossessed by local authorities at the beginning of the summer break.

Hornsey achieved notoriety because of the scale of the all-night protests and sit-ins, which were copied in similar art schools around the UK. During the six weeks that the sit-in lasted, Hornsey became the focus of debate about the method of art education and teaching in Britain. Hornsey was, and still is, afforded the blame for these disturbances that swept the student fraternity nationwide. 

Kim Howells, a student, and Nick Wright, then president of the Students' Union on a sabbatical year, initiated the sit-in.  Howells later became a trade union official and a minister in Tony Blair's government. After the protests, Tom Nairn, then a sociology lecturer, was dismissed from the college.

The Hornsey Affair, a book by students and staff at Hornsey, was published in 1969 by Penguin Books. A documentary film, Our Live Experiment is Worth More Than 3,000 Textbooks, about the Hornsey sit-in was directed by John Goldschmidt for Granada Television and transmitted in 1969.

Patricia Holland's Hornsey Film "reconstructs the arguments and succession of events that led to the occupation of Hornsey College of Art between May and July 1968".

Part of the Hornsey Archive is currently held at Middlesex University in the Sheppard Library as one of their special collections.

In April 1969 a follow-up mock funeral procession, performed by students of the art school, declared "the death of Hornsey Hope".

Recent use of the building
Middlesex University vacated the Crouch End building in the 1980s. The building was then used by the TUC as a training and conference centre. Since 2008, the building has been a part of Coleridge Primary School, upon its expansion to four-form entry.

Notable alumni and teachers  

 Viv Albertine (b.1954), musician
 Stuart Brisley (b.1933), artist and teacher
 Graham Lewis (b.1953), (Wire), musician
 Neville Brody (b.1957), typographer, art director and graphic designer
 Michael Casson (1925-2003), potter
 Michelle Cartlidge, writer and illustrator
 Eileen Chandler (1904-1993), portrait painter
 Peter Cook (b. 1936), architect
 Wendy Dagworthy (b.1950) OBE, fashion designer and Royal College of Art professor 
 Joseph Darracott (1934-1998), art historian and writer
 Ray Davies (b.1944), musician (Kinks)
 Lynsey de Paul (1948-2014), singer-songwriter
 Ted Dicks (1928-2012), composer
 Eve Disher (1894–1991), portrait painter
 Les Edwards (b.1949), illustrator
 Edwin Embleton (1907 – 2000), graphic designer
 Robert Fuest (1927-2012), film director
 Violet Fuller (1920-2006), artist
 Hannah Gavron (1936-1965), sociologist
 Stuart Goddard (b.1954) (Adam Ant), musician
 Doc Rowe (b.1944), folklorist
 James Herbert (1943-2013), novelist
 Adrian Hill (1895–1977), artist and broadcaster
 Kathleen Horsman (1911–1999), potter
 Ken Howard (b.1932), artist
 Moira Huntly (b.1932), artist
 Allen Jones (b.1937), artist
 Anish Kapoor (b.1954), artist
 Ken Kiff (1935-2001), artist
 Dorothy King (1907-1990), artist
 Bryan Kneale (b.1930), artist
 Bruce Lacey (1927-2016), performance artist 
 Dorothy Larcher (1884–1952), textile designer
 Roger Law (b.1941), teacher, illustrator and co-creator of TV series Spitting Image 
 Dante Leonelli (b.1931), artist
 Daphne McClure (b.1930), artist
 Stefana McClure (b.1959), artist
 Tom Nairn (b.1932), academic and writer
 John Napier (b.1944), theatre designer
 Paul Neagu (1938-2004), sculptor, performance artist
 Sam Peffer (1921-2014), commercial artist
 Richard Robbins (1927-2009), artist, sculptor and art teacher
 Hallsteinn Sigurðsson (b.1945), Icelandic sculptor and visual artist
 Norman Toynton (b.1939), artist
 Stanley Warren (1917-1992), art teacher, creator of the Changi Murals as a Japanese prisoner of war
 Eric Watson (1955-2012), photographer
 Richard Wentworth (b.1947), artist
 Colin Chilvers (b.1945), visual effects director and film director
 Richard Wilson (b.1953), sculptor
 Theresa Wiseman (b.1956), footballer and animator
 Pulak Biswas (1941-2013), Indian illustrator
 The Raincoats, rock band, members Gina Birch and Ana da Silva

References

Educational institutions established in 1880
1880 establishments in England
Art schools in London
Education in the London Borough of Haringey
Middlesex University